A statue of Ignacio Vallarta is installed in Puerto Vallarta's Plaza de Armas, in the Mexican state of Jalisco.

The sculpture had previously been located at Park Aquiles Serdan. It was donated by former governor Juan Gil Preciado and was inaugurated in 1964 by then mayor Carlos Arreola Lima.

See also

 Statue of Ignacio Vallarta (Guadalajara)

References

External links
 

Bronze sculptures in Mexico
Centro, Puerto Vallarta
Monuments and memorials in Jalisco
Outdoor sculptures in Puerto Vallarta
Sculptures of men in Mexico
Statues in Jalisco